Murray Edward McLauchlan,  (born 30 June 1948) is a Canadian singer, songwriter, guitarist, pianist, and harmonica player. He is best known for his Canadian hits "Farmer's Song," "Whispering Rain," and "Down by the Henry Moore".

Early life 

McLauchlan was born in Paisley, Renfrewshire, Scotland; he immigrated to Canada with his family when he was five years old. He grew up in suburban Toronto. At 17, he began playing at coffeehouses in Toronto's Yorkville area and later attended Central Tech as an art student before deciding to become a full-time musician.

Career
In the 1960s McLauchlan moved to New York City, but had little success in promoting his musical career there. In 1970, McLauchlan returned to Toronto and signed with True North Records; he released an album, Songs from the Street in 1971. Over the next several years he had success in the pop, adult contemporary, country, and folk-music fields, with such songs as "Child's Song," the Juno Award-winning "Farmer's Song" (1973), and "Hurricane of Change" (also 1973).

In 1974 McLauchlan embarked on a long tour in the United States. He later released "Do You Dream of Being Somebody" (1975), and "Whispering Rain" (1979).

In 1980, McLauchlan released the album Into a Mystery, with backing vocals by Carole Pope.

In 1987, McLauchlan appeared on the children's television show, Sharon, Lois & Bram's Elephant Show singing his Juno-Award-Winning Farmer's Song. He appeared in Season 4 of The Elephant Show on the "Urban Cowboy" episode.

McLauchlan hosted the highly rated CBC Radio program Swinging On a Star from 1989 to 1994.

McLauchlan has held a commercial pilot license (CPL) with Instrument flight rating (IFR) and endorsements for multi-engine aircraft and seaplanes for decades. During a performance in the 1980s, McLauchlan commented to audiences, half-jokingly, of "giving this music thing a little more time" before giving it up and returning to flying for a living.

In the late 1990s, McLauchlan was flying commercial airplanes as a "bush pilot" in Northern Canada. In 1986 he starred in a television special called Floating over Canada, in which he piloted a Cessna 185 float plane across Canada. This special was broadcast on U.S. public television on PBS, as well as in Canada on CBC.

In 1998, Penguin (Viking Books) released his autobiography The Ballad of Murray McLauchlan: Getting Out of Here Alive.

In 2004 McLauchlan helped form a group known as "Lunch At Allen's" featuring McLauchlan, Marc Jordan, Cindy Church and Ian Thomas. The group formed as a result of meeting in Toronto for lunch at Allen's restaurant after McLauchlan's heart bypass surgery. Three CDs have been released as a result of this collaboration: Lunch at Allens (2004), Catch the Moon (2007) and More Lunch at Allens (2010).

During the summer of 2016, he was performing in Lunch at Allen's in Ontario, Canada.

Awards
McLauchlan has won 10 Juno Awards throughout the 1970s and 1980s, and been nominated for a total of 23 Juno awards. In 1993, he was made a Member of the Order of Canada.

In 2001, McLauchlan was the recipient of the National Achievement Award at the annual SOCAN Awards held in Toronto.

McLauchlan was chosen to be inducted into the Canadian Country Music Hall of Fame in September 2016.

Family
He is married to Denise Donlon and they have a son, Duncan (b. March 1992).

Discography

Murray McLauchlan solo career (1971–2021)

Albums

With Lunch at Allen's (2004–present)

Albums

Singles

See also

Canadian rock
Music of Canada

References

Further reading

 Adria, Marco, "The Importance of Being Murray," Music of Our Times: Eight Canadian Singer-Songwriters (Toronto, Lorimer, 1990), pp. 103–20.
 Murrary McLauchlan, Getting Out Of Here Alive-The Ballad Of Murray McLauchlan (Viking 1998) 
 Murray McLauchlan Biography at Maple Music

External links

 
 Murray McLauchlan at The Canadian Encyclopedia
 Entry at canadianbands.com
 
 

1948 births
Living people
Canadian country singer-songwriters
Canadian male singer-songwriters
Canadian folk singer-songwriters
Juno Award for Songwriter of the Year winners
Members of the Order of Canada
Musicians from Paisley, Renfrewshire
Scottish emigrants to Canada
Commercial aviators